Nana Mizuki Live Formula at Saitama Super Arena is the sixth live DVD release from J-pop star and voice actress Nana Mizuki. It was ranked #1 in weekly Oricon chart for music DVD, and #4 for all DVD (including movies).

Track listing

The first two discs contain Live Formula 2007-2008 that was held on 2008-01-03 at the Saitama Super Arena, which broke her own record for having 16,000 audience, and also marked her 50th live concert since her debut. Most of the songs performed are from her latest album Great Activity. There's a special audio commentary by Nana Mizuki herself too.

Disc 1

OPENING
Bring it on！
Secret Ambition
MC 1

RUSH＆DASH！
chronicle of sky
through the night
Pray
Innocent Starter
MC 2
Heart-shaped chant (Special guest harpist Mika Agematsu)
MC 3
 (acoustic)
Crystal Letter (acoustic)
Take a chance
Power Gate
Super Generation

Disc 2

Massive Wonders
Eternal Blaze

Orchestral Fantasia
MC 4
Sing Forever
ENCORE
Seven
Justice to Believe
MC 5
Dancing in the velvet moon
Level Hi！
MC 6
 ～a cappella～
MC 7
end roll

Disc 3

Contains footage of Live Formula 2007-2008 that took place in Christmas Eve and New Year Eve.

2007.12.24 at Sendai Sunplaza Hall

Inside of mind
Brave Phoenix
Promise on Christmas

2007.12.31 at Grand Cube Osaka

Countdown 2007-2008
Super Generation

Special features

Making of Live Formula
Nana x Cherry Boys

External links
 Information on official website

Nana Mizuki video albums
Live video albums
Albums recorded at Saitama Super Arena
2008 video albums